Norwich CBS Football Club is a football club based in Norwich, Norfolk, England.

History
The club was formed in 1888 as the works team of Norwich Union. They became members of the Norwich & District Business House League and were Division One champions in 1926–27, 1946–47 and 1947–48. The club then moved up to the East Anglian League, entering Division One in 1955. When the league merged with the Norfolk & Suffolk League to form the Anglian Combination in 1964, the club became members of Section A of the new league.

Norwich Union were Premier Division runners-up in 1987–88, before winning the division the following season. After winning the Norfolk Junior Cup in 1998–99, they were Division Two champions in 1999–2000. In 2002–03 the club were promoted back to the Premier Division. After becoming AFC Norwich in 2008, in 2009 they were renamed Spixworth after relocating to the village. They won the league's Mummery Cup in 2010–11 and 2014–15, and were runners-up in the Premier Division in 2012–13, 2013–14 and 2015–16. In 2016–17 the club won the Premier Division title, earning promotion to Division One of the Eastern Counties League. They were then renamed Norwich CBS after relocating to Bowthorpe.

Ground
The club played at Pinebanks in Thorpe St Andrew until 2008. After a year at Dussindale, the club moved to Crotstwick Lane in Spixworth in 2009. In 2017 Spixworth Parish Council informed the club that it was no longer able to use the ground, resulting in them relocating to the Football Development Centre in Bowthorpe.

Honours
Anglian Combination
Premier Division champions 1988–89, 2016–17
Division Two champions 1999–2000
Mummery Cup winners 2010–11, 2014–15
Norwich & District Business House League
Champions 1926–27, 1946–47, 1947–48
Norfolk Junior Cup
Winners 1998–99

Records
Best FA Cup performance: Extra preliminary round, 2019–20
Best FA Vase performance: Fourth round, 2017–18

References

External links
Official website

Football clubs in England
Football clubs in Norfolk
1888 establishments in England
Association football clubs established in 1888
Sport in Norwich
Norwich and District Saturday Football League
East Anglian League
Anglian Combination
Eastern Counties Football League
Financial services association football clubs in England